Son Min-chol (born 27 October 1986) is a Japanese-born North Korean footballer who is currently a free agent.

Career

Japan
He played for F.C. Ryūkyū in the Japan Football League, and later the Japanese Regional Leagues side FC Korea.

India
On 9 June it was announced that he had signed a contract with I-League side Shillong Laong. On 6 October he made his I-League debut against Mohun Bagan.
On 17 April 2013, his header gave his side a lead against Mumbai, to help his side register a 2-0 win. Minchol was also captain of the Shillong Lajong squad for the 2013-14 season where the club finished at its highest ever standing.

Hong Kong
On 4 August 2017, Son was announced as a player for Hong Kong Premier League club Lee Man.

International career

Son was called up to the North Korean squad in June 2014. In 2018, Son received a call-up from the United Koreans in Japan squad ahead of the 2018 ConIFA World Football Cup.

Personal life
Minchol is a North Korean born in Japan. He studied at Korea University.

References

External links
 

1986 births
Living people
North Korean footballers
Expatriate footballers in India
North Korean expatriate sportspeople in India
Shillong Lajong FC players
I-League players
Expatriate footballers in Japan
Sportspeople from Kyoto
North Korean expatriates in Japan
Expatriate footballers in Hong Kong
Lee Man FC players
Hong Kong Premier League players
Zainichi Korean people
Association football defenders